TriBBS is a computer bulletin board system (BBS) designed for MS-DOS-based computers.

History
TriBBS was written by Mark Goodwin and marketed through his company, TriSoft. TriBBS was written in C++ and assembly language. TriBBS development was guided primarily by the requests and suggestions of the SysOps who used the program.  As a result, the TriBBS Application Program Interface was added by Goodwin to aid other software developers in making third party software operate seamlessly with TriBBS.

In 1997, TriBBS was sold to Gary Price of Freejack's Software, who had previously developed a collection of add-ons and tools for use with TriBBS.  Apart from a handful of small feature additions, the most significant contribution Price made was making TriBBS Y2K-compliant.

In 2000, TriBBS was sold again, this time to Frank Prue of PTC Software.  Shortly after the acquisition, PTC Software announced via the alt.bbs.tribbs newsgroup that they intended to release a 32-bit version of TriBBS.  It has never been released.

Current status

The latest version of TriBBS v11.6 was released 23 March 2002.

External links
 Marc Brooks' TriBBS 10.x/11.x Software

Bulletin board system software